Neomilichia is a genus of moths in the family Noctuidae.

References
Natural History Museum Lepidoptera genus database

Hadeninae